Miesha McKelvy-Jones (born July 27, 1976) is an American hurdler who specializes in the 100 metres hurdles.

She won bronze medals at the Pan American Games in Winnipeg, the 2003 World Championships in Paris and the 2003 World Athletics Final in Monaco.

Her personal best time is 12.51 seconds, achieved in May 2003 in Eugene, Oregon.

She has not competed on top international level since 2004.

References

External links 
 
 Profile at USA Track and Field

1976 births
Living people
American female hurdlers
World Athletics Championships medalists
Athletes (track and field) at the 1999 Pan American Games
Pan American Games bronze medalists for the United States
San Diego State Aztecs women's track and field athletes
Pan American Games medalists in athletics (track and field)
Medalists at the 1999 Pan American Games
20th-century American women
21st-century American women